Circuit rider clergy, in the earliest years of the United States, were clergy assigned to travel around specific geographic territories to minister to settlers and organize congregations. Circuit riders were clergy in the Methodist Episcopal Church and related denominations, although similar itinerant preachers could be found in other faiths as well, particularly among minority faith groups.

History
In sparsely populated areas of the United States it always has been common for clergy in many denominations to serve more than one congregation at a time, a form of church organization sometimes called a "preaching circuit". In the contemporary United Methodist Church, a minister serving more than one church has a "(number of churches) point charge". However, in the rough frontier days of the early United States, the pattern of organization in the Methodist Episcopal denomination and its successors worked especially well in the service of rural villages and unorganized settlements. In the Methodist denominations, congregations do not "call" (or employ) a pastor of their own choice. Instead, a bishop "appoints" (assigns) a pastor to a congregation or a group of congregations, and until late in the 20th century, neither pastor nor congregation had any say in the appointment. This meant that in the early days of the United States, as the population developed, Methodist clergy could be appointed to circuits wherever people were settling.

A "circuit" (nowadays referred to as a charge) was a geographic area that encompassed two or more local churches. Pastors met each year at "Annual Conference" where their bishops would appoint them either to a new circuit or to remain at the same one. Most often they were moved to another appointment every year. (In 1804, the Methodist Episcopal General Conference decreed that no pastor was to serve the same appointment for more than two consecutive years.)  Once a pastor was assigned a circuit, it was his responsibility to conduct worship and visit members of each church in his charge on a regular basis in addition to possibly establishing new churches. He was supervised by a Presiding Elder (now called a District Superintendent) who would visit each charge four times a year (the "Quarterly Conference").

Rural locations
Riding on horseback between distant churches, these preachers were popularly called "circuit riders" or "saddlebag preachers" although their official role was "traveling clergy" (a term still used in Methodist denominations). Carrying only what could fit in their saddlebags, they traveled through wilderness and villages, preaching every day at any place available (peoples' cabins, courthouses, fields, meeting houses, even basements and street corners).  Unlike clergy in urban areas, Methodist circuit riders were always on the move, needing five to six weeks to cover the longest routes.  Their ministerial activity boosted Methodism into the largest Protestant denomination at the time, with 14,986 members and 83 traveling preachers in 1784  and by 1839, 749,216 members served by 3,557 traveling preachers and 5,856 local preachers.

The early frontier ministry was often lonely and dangerous. Samuel Wakefield's hymn describes a circuit rider's family anxiously waiting for the preacher's return; the final stanza reads

Yet still they look with glistening eye,
Till lo! a herald hastens nigh;
He comes the tale of woe to tell,
How he, their prop and glory fell;
How died he in a stranger’s room,
How strangers laid him in the tomb,
How spoke he with his latest breath,
And loved and blessed them all in death.

Bishop Francis Asbury
Francis Asbury (1745–1816), the founding bishop of American Methodism, established the precedent for circuit riding. Together with his driver and partner "Black Harry" Hosier, he traveled 270,000 miles and preached 16,000 sermons as he made his way up and down early America supervising clergy.  He brought the concept of the circuit from English Methodism, where it still exists: British Methodist churches are grouped in circuits, which typically include a dozen or more churches, and ministers are appointed ("stationed") to the circuit, not to the local church.  A typical English circuit has two or three times as many churches as ministers, the balance of the services being led by lay Methodist local preachers or retired ("supernumerary") ministers. The title circuit rider, however, was an American coinage born of American necessities. Although John Wesley, the founder of Methodism, covered enormous distances on horseback during his career, and early British Methodist preachers also rode around their circuits, in general they had far less formidable traveling commitments than their American counterparts.

Modern Methodist practices
As well as being constantly on the move between the churches in their charge, Methodist ministers were regularly moved between charges, a principal known as itinerancy.  Although most charges in the United States now consist of a single church, the tradition of itinerancy is still alive and functioning today in American Methodism, as it is in most Methodist Churches worldwide.  Although not moving as frequently as in the past, the average U.S. United Methodist Church pastor will stay at a local church for 2–5 years before being appointed to another charge at the Annual Conference (although technically, every pastor is assigned to a charge every year, it is just usually the same one).  In British Methodism, ministers are normally appointed to a circuit for five years (again, they are stationed there annually by the Conference); the Conference may not station someone beyond this period without an invitation from the Circuit Meeting for that minister to remain in the circuit, but it is unusual for a minister to stay for longer than seven or eight years in one circuit.

Examples
Possibly the most famous circuit rider was Peter Cartwright, who wrote two autobiographies. John B. Matthias was an early circuit rider from New York state who is credited with having written a gospel hymn, "Palms of Victory." Wilbur Fisk, who became an educator, served as a circuit rider for three years. It was not uncommon for clergy to serve on circuits for a few years and then go to other work. Kentucky native Eli P. Farmer, a circuit rider for the Methodist Episcopal Church on the Indiana frontier from 1825 to 1839, became a Bloomington, Indiana, farmer, newspaper editor, and businessman. He later served in the Indiana Senate (1843 to 1845) and as a self-appointed chaplain during the American Civil War. Joseph Tarkington, another circuit rider in Indiana, was the grandfather of novelist Booth Tarkington.

William G. "Parson" Brownlow, Tennessee's radical newspaper publisher, noted book author, American Civil War-Reconstruction Era Tennessee governor, and U.S. Senator, began his career as a circuit rider in the 1820s and 1830s.  Brownlow gained wide notoriety for his wild clashes --- both in person and in print --- with rival Baptist and Presbyterian missionaries and Christian sectarian authors across the Southern Appalachian region of the United States. Brownlow's books detailing the Confederate States of America military occupation of his hometown of Knoxville, Tennessee, and his own time briefly spent in a Confederate prison during the American Civil War gained Brownlow a greatly expanded audience across the northern United States who were eager to purchase both his books and admission tickets for his northern U.S. speaking tour during the later years of the American Civil War.

The father of outlaw John Wesley Hardin, James "Gip" Hardin, was a Methodist preacher and circuit rider in the mid-1800s.  Hardin's father traveled over much of central Texas on his preaching circuit until 1869 when he and his family settled in Sumpter, Trinity County, Texas where he established a school – also named for John Wesley, the founder of Methodism.

Thomas S. Hinde was a Methodist circuit rider in Illinois, Indiana, Kentucky and Missouri from the early 1800s until about 1825. He eventually settled in Mount Carmel, Illinois, the town he had earlier founded. Hinde was a notable minister, newspaper publisher, attorney, real estate entrepreneur and clerk for the Ohio House of Representatives. More than 47 volumes of his personal and business documents are among the Lyman Draper collection at the Wisconsin Historical Society, since they were donated after his death by his son in law Charles H. Constable.

Father Pierre Yves Kéralum was a Catholic priest who ministered to ranchers in the Lower Rio Grande Valley from 1853 to 1872. He was one of about thirty Catholic priests known as the Cavalry of Christ because they traveled on horseback. Kéralum was also an architect who designed and helped build churches such as the Immaculate Conception Cathedral in Brownsville, Texas, as well as chapels, rectories, and other buildings in the region.

In culture
In retrospect, the circuit rider became a romantic figure and was featured in a number of novels in the late 19th and early 20th centuries. Two of the better known novels are Edward Eggleston's The Circuit Rider. and Ernest Thompson Seton's Preacher of Cedar Mountain.

A circuit rider is also a character in the Newbery Award–winning novel for children, "Caddie Woodlawn", set in western Wisconsin in the 1860s.

During the 1970s, prior to its sign-off message, Richmond, Virginia television station WWBT broadcast "Justice and The Circuit Rider", a rural preacher appearing on his mount, Justice, and presenting a brief parable using props from his saddlebag. These spots also appeared on the Richmond ABC affiliate WXEX, now operating as WRIC-TV just after the end of "Shock Theater". In these short films, the host was identified only as the Circuit Rider from Cobbs Creek, Virginia at the end of the three-minute segment. The preacher was William B. Livermon Sr., who served several Virginia churches during his lifetime before passing away in 1992.

Inspired by the story of Catholic circuit rider Pierre Yves Kéralum, author Paul Horgan wrote a fictionalized account of the priest's last days titled The Devil in the Desert (1952).

Autobiographies
The first-person accounts of pioneer circuit riders give insight to the culture of the early United States as well as the theology and sociology of religion (and especially Methodism) in the young nation. Quite a few circuit riders published memoirs. These are generally available in the collections of United Methodist seminary libraries. The United Library of Garrett-Evangelical Theological Seminary and Seabury-Western Theological Seminary (Evanston, Illinois) seems to have the largest collection of these writings, including over 70 items.

Through his role as chairman of the United Methodist editorial committee in Shreveport, Louisiana in the latter 1970s, the historian Walter M. Lowrey spearheaded a project, A History of Louisiana Methodism, which includes material on the church's extensive network of circuit riders.

References

Further reading
With the advent of Google Books, several memoirs became available on-line. Here is a list of some circuit rider memoirs available through Google Books:

Bangs, Nathan. The life of the Rev. Freeborn Garrettson [1752–1827], 1845.
Dyer, John Lewis, 1812–1901. The Snow-shoe Itinerant : An Autobiography of the Rev. John L. Dyer, Familiarly Known as "Father Dyer" of the Colorado Conference, 1890.
Richardson, Simon Peter, 1818–1899. The Lights and Shadows of Itinerant Life, 1900 
Finley, James Bradley, 1781–1856 (W. P. Stricklkand, Ed.). Autobiography of Rev. James B. Finley, or, Pioneer Life in the West, 1856.
Caughey, James, 1810?–1891. Earnest Christianity Illustrated, 1855.
Hibbard, Billy, 1771–1844. Memoirs of the Life and Travels of B. Hibbard, 1843  (Someone wrote “Good Circuit Riding” on one of the unnumbered front pages of the Google copy.)
Peterson, Daniel H. The looking-glass: being a true report and narrative of the life, travels and labors of the Rev. Daniel H. Peterson, a colored clergyman; embracing a period of time from the year 1812 to 1854, and including his visit to western Africa, 1854.
Zersen, Frederick. The Second Circuit Rider on the Soo Line. Concordia Historical Institute Quarterly, Summer 1990, Vol. 63, No. 2.

In addition, St. George's Methodist Church in Philadelphia recently digitized the diaries of circuit rider David Dailey

Methodist ecclesiastical offices